Robert Menzies (born 4 November 1955) is an Australian actor, who is best known for starring in Three Dollars. Menzies was nominated as Best Lead Actor in Television Drama in the 2009 AFI Awards for Television for his acting in the ABC TV production of 3 Acts of Murder.

He is the grandson of former Australian Prime Minister Sir Robert Menzies and his wife, Dame Pattie Menzies.

References

External links
3 Acts of Murder official website
3 Acts of Murder youtube Behind The Scenes

1955 births
People educated at Haileybury (Melbourne)
Australian male television actors
Australian people of Cornish descent
Australian people of Scottish descent
Helpmann Award winners
Living people
Australian male film actors
Australian male stage actors